Qifu Guoren (died 388), formally the Prince Xuanlie of Yuanchuan (苑川宣烈王), was the founding monarch of the Xianbei-led Western Qin dynasty of China.

Qifu Guoren's father Qifu Sifan (乞伏司繁) was a Xianbei tribal chief in the modern southern/southwestern Gansu region who, after being defeated by the Former Qin general Wang Tong (王統), surrendered in 371 and was allowed to keep his tribe together as a Former Qin vassal.  In 376, Qifu Sifan died, and Qifu Guoren succeeded him.  When the Former Qin emperor Fu Jiān sought to conquer Jin Dynasty (266–420) to unite China in 383, Qifu Guoren was initially going to serve as a general in his advance troops, but at that time, Qifu Guoren's uncle Qifu Butui (乞伏步頹) rebelled, and Fu Jiān sent Qifu Guoren to put down his uncle's rebellion.  Instead, Qifu Guoren and Qifu Butui joined forces, and Qifu Guoren declared that Former Qin had worn out its people and that he was establishing an independent state—although at that time he did not take any regal title or declare a new era name.

In 385, after hearing about Fu Jiān's death at the hands of another rebel general, Yao Chang (the founder of Later Qin), Qifu Guoren did declare himself chanyu and changed the era name, thus effectively declaring a break from Former Qin, and thus this date was typically considered the founding date of Western Qin.  He divided his domain into 12 commanderies, and he established his capital at Yongshicheng (勇士城, in modern Lanzhou, Gansu).  Over the next two years, he gradually drew the Xianbei and other ethnicities into his state.

In 387, however, contrary to his prior stance against Former Qin, Qifu Guoren accepted the title of Prince of Yuanchuan bestowed on him by the Former Qin emperor Fu Deng and nominally became a Former Qin vassal again, although he did not use the Former Qin era name.

In summer 388, Qifu Guoren died.  His son Qifu Gongfu (乞伏公府) was still young, and his subordinates supported his brother Qifu Gangui to succeed him.

Personal information
 Father
 Qifu Sifan (乞伏司繁), Xianbei tribal chief
 Children
 Qifu Gongfu (乞伏公府) (executed 412)
 Qifu Achai (乞伏阿柴) (executed 412)

References

Western Qin princes
388 deaths
Former Qin generals
Year of birth unknown
People from Northwest China
Founding monarchs